In geometry, the Lemoine point, Grebe point or symmedian point is the intersection of the three symmedians (medians reflected at the associated angle bisectors) of a triangle. 

Ross Honsberger called its existence "one of the crown jewels of modern geometry".

In the Encyclopedia of Triangle Centers the symmedian point appears as the sixth point, X(6). For a non-equilateral triangle, it lies in the open orthocentroidal disk punctured at its own center, and could be any point therein.

The symmedian point of a triangle with side lengths ,  and  has homogeneous trilinear coordinates .

An algebraic way to find the symmedian point is to express the triangle by three linear equations in two unknowns given by the hesse normal forms of the corresponding lines. The solution of this overdetermined system found by the least squares method gives the coordinates of the point. It also solves the optimization problem to find the point with a minimal sum of squared distances from the sides.
The Gergonne point of a triangle is the same as the symmedian point of the triangle's contact triangle.

It can be shown that these three lines meet at a point using Brianchon's theorem.

The French mathematician Émile Lemoine proved the existence of the symmedian point in 1873, and Ernst Wilhelm Grebe published a paper on it in 1847. Simon Antoine Jean L'Huilier had also noted the point in 1809.

For the extension to an irregular tetrahedron see symmedian.

Notes

References

External links 
 

Triangle centers